Iossif Surchadzhiev (born 2 May 1945) is a Bulgarian stage and film actor. He has appeared in more than fifty films since making his screen debut in 1952.

Life and career
Surchadzhiev was born on 2 May 1945 in Sofia in the family of director Stefan Sarchadzhiev, founder of the Satirical Theatre, and Anna Fadenhecht, daughter of lawyer and politician Yosif Fadenhecht. His mother was of Jewish descent. In 1970, he graduated from the National Academy for Theatre and Film Arts. After graduating, he performed in various stage productions around Bulgaria.

He is a member of the Union of Bulgarian Artists and the Union of Bulgarian Filmmakers since 1973.

In 2004, Surchadzhiev suffered a severe stroke, from which he recovered for years. His wife Raina Tomova, with whom he has a daughter, is a screenwriter. He has an estranged daughter, Aleksandra Sarchadjieva, from his relationship with actress Pepa Nikolova.

In 2013, he appeared in the TV7 period drama series The Tree of Life.

Selected filmography

Film

Television

References

External links
 

1945 births
Living people
Male actors from Sofia
Bulgarian male film actors
Bulgarian male television actors
Bulgarian male stage actors
20th-century Bulgarian male actors
21st-century Bulgarian male actors
Bulgarian people of Jewish descent
National Academy for Theatre and Film Arts alumni